How We Think is a book written by the American educational philosopher John Dewey, published in 1910. It was reissued in a substantially revised edition in 1933.

The original version has 14 chapters and opens with the words Chapter 1 is then concerned with establishing a "single consistent meaning" for "thinking" and "thought".

References

External links
 
 

1910 non-fiction books
Books about education